Paracanoe is canoeing for athletes with a range of physical disabilities. The Paralympic version of the sport is governed by the International Canoe Federation (ICF), and a va'a-specific variant is governed by the International Va'a Federation (IVF).

A meeting of the International Paralympic Committee in Guangzhou, China in 2010 decided to add paracanoe to the Paralympic programme. As a result, paracanoe debuted at the Rio 2016 Summer Paralympics where single kayak races were contested.

Equipment

The two main types of paracanoe boat are kayaks (K), with a double-blade paddle, and outrigger canoes called va'as (V) where the paddler has a second hull as a support float and uses a single blade paddle with a T-top handle.

ICF paracanoe

Classification

In the single kayak, there are three event classifications (linked to different levels of mobility impairment) for both men and women:

KL1 (formerly A; Arms) This grouping is for paddlers who have no trunk function (i.e. shoulder function only). A KL1 class paddler is able to apply force predominantly using the arms and/or shoulders.
KL2 (formerly TA; Trunk and Arms): paddlers who have good use of the trunk and arms, but limited use of their legs. They are unable to apply continuous and controlled force to the footboard or seat to propel the boat.
KL3 (formerly LTA; Legs, Trunk and Arms): this class is for paddlers with a disability who have good use of their legs, trunk and arms for paddling, and who can apply force to the foot board or the seat to propel the boat.

There is also a three-tier ICF classification system in place for single va'a events (VL1, VL2, VL3).

Competition format

All international paracanoe competitions are held over 200 metres in single kayak or va'a boats.

It is contested at World Championships, World Cups and continental championships. As of November 2021, ten of the twelve events (all six kayak events, both VL2 and VL3 events) are also on the Paralympic programme.

ICF World Championships

At the 2009 ICF Canoe Sprint World Championships in Dartmouth, four 'paddability' races featured as non-medal exhibition events, including two male-female mixed disciplines in kayak doubles and in doubles canoe ('aka' Canadian or kneeling canoeing).

The sport made its official World Championship debut in 2010 and has been contested at every World Championship since, including the standalone Paralympic-year ICF Paracanoe World Championships in 2012 and 2016.

IVF paracanoe

In IVF competition, a points system is used with a higher number assigned to less impaired paddlers and lower points for more severe impairment.

In team events the total number of points of a boat crew are limited; 26 points in 6-person boats and 52 for 12-person boats. In single-seat boats competition take place in three divisions; division 1 for 5 or 6-point paddlers, division 2 for 4-point paddlers and division 3 is for 2 or 3-point paddlers. 1-point paddlers do not participate in singles races. The three divisions approximately correspond to the three ICF va'a classes.

See also
 Paracanoeing at the 2016 Summer Paralympics

References

External links

 
Paralympic sports
Canoeing disciplines